Dwarkadheesh– Bhagwaan Shree Krishna, is an Indian television Mythological Series.It began airing on 4 July 2011 on Imagine TV and was stopped abruptly midway with the shutdown of Imagine TV in April 2012. The series intended to show Krishna as a valiant lover; a master strategist; and an ideal brother, father, son, and king. Renowned composer Ravindra Jain composed the title song (sung by Anup Jalota) as well as music for the initial episodes. Afterwards the composer was replaced by music director-duo Sunny Bawra and Inder Bawra (Bawra Bros). The serial was produced by Sagar films and had a re-run during the pandemic in 2020.

Plot
The series focused on Krishna's adventures as the prince of Mathura and on his relationships with his elder brother Balram, sister-in-law Revati, to-be wife Rukmini, etc.

The series followed Krishna's life after he killed his evil uncle, demon-king Kamsa and became prince of Dwarka. It begins with Krishna engaging in battle with the wicked Kalayavana, an ally of king Jarasandh of Magadh, who has already lost 16 battles against Prince Krishna.

Cast
 Vishal Karwal as Krishna (incarnation of Lord Vishnu)
 Hemant Chadha as Balram (incarnation of serpent-king Shesha)
 Gauri Singh as Revati
 Priya Bathija / Payal Shrivastav as Rukmini (incarnation of Goddess Lakshmi)
 Gautam Sharma as Arjun
 Shantipriya as Devki (Krishna's mother)
 Puneet Issar as Jarasandh of Magadh
 Ram Awana as Paundraka Vasudeva
 Nikitin Dheer as Kalayavana 
 Karan Khanna as Shishupala of Chedi (final demon incarnation of Jai, gatekeeper of Vaikunth)
 Arun Singh as Jwala
 Urvashi Pardeshi as Satyabhama
 Rashmi Singh as Jambavati
 Mamik Singh as Bhishma
 Gufi Paintal as Shakuni, King of Gandhar
 Sachin Verma as Yudhishthir
 Amit Pachori as Duryodhan
 Thakur Anoop Singh as Dushasan
 Lankesh Bhardwaj as Thakur Akhilesh
 Nishant Kumar as Uddhav
 Ram Bahadur Renu as Sudama

External links 

 Production website

References 

Imagine TV original programming
2011 Indian television series debuts
2012 Indian television series endings
Indian television soap operas
Television series based on Mahabharata